The Riggs Road Line, designated as Routes R1 & R2, is a daily bus route operated by the Washington Metropolitan Area Transit Authority between Fort Totten station of the Red, Green and Yellow Lines of the Washington Metro & Adelphi (R1) or Calverton (R2). Routes R1 & R2 operate every 20 minutes during peak hours and route R2 operates every 35-60 minutes at other times on weekdays, and 60 minutes on the weekends. R1 trips are roughly 32 minutes and R2 trips are roughly 55 minutes.

Background 
Route R1 and R2 provides service along Riggs Road between Fort Totten station and Adelphi or Calverton. Route R1 operates in the weekday peak-hour direction only while route R2 operates daily. The line operates every 20-30 minutes during weekday peak hours, 35 minutes at all other times on weekdays, and 55-65 on the weekends.

Routes R1 and R2 currently operates from Bladensburg division but had some trips operated by Northern division during peak hours until 2018. The line often utilizes articulated buses due to its high ridership volume.

R1 Stops

R2 Stops

History
The Riggs Road Line was originally operated by routes R8 and R9 beginning in the 1970s running from Downtown DC to Calverton. Around the late 1970s, service to Downtown was discontinued and was replaced by the Red Line.

Route R2 was created on February 6, 1978, to serve as part of the Queens Chapel Road Line running with routes R4, R6, and R7. Route R2 operated between the newly opened Brookland–CUA station and Centerpark Office Park in Calverton, via Queens Chapel Road, Belcrest Road, Prince George's Plaza, Baltimore Avenue, Rhode Island Avenue, and Powder Mill Road. 

At one point, route R2 would operate between Calverton and Kennedy Center but was later shortened to Brookland–CUA station. Around the same time, route R8 along with the R4 would operate between Calverton and Crystal City station but would be later shorten to Fort Totten station. Route R5 would also operate between Fort McNair and Kennedy Center but would be later replaced. 

On December 11, 1993, R2 was rerouted to operate between Fort Totten station and intersection of Plum Orchard Drive and Broadbirch Drive in Calverton, Maryland via Riggs Road, East-West Highway, Prince George's Plaza station, Prince George's Plaza, Powder Mill Road, Beltsville Drive, Calverton Boulevard, Broadbirch Drive, Plum Orchard Drive, and Cherry Hill Road completely replacing routes R8 and R9. Unlike the former R8 and R9 routes, route R2 was rerouted to divert from Riggs Road onto East-West Highway and travel eastwards on East-West Highway to serve both Prince George's Plaza station and Prince George's Plaza mall, before returning westwards on East-West Highway, to rejoin Riggs Road and take over the former R8 routing. Service along East-West Highway, Baltimore Avenue, Rhode Island Avenue, and Powder Mill Road, was replaced by route 86.

Route R7 also joined the Riggs Road Line operating the same routing as route R2 but diverting into the United States Army Research Laboratory along Floral Drive.

WMATA also created the new R1 and R5 routes, to serve as part of the Riggs Road Line. R5 would follow most of R2's route to Calverton except not serving Prince George's Plaza station and Prince George's Plaza Mall and instead remain straight up on Riggs Road past East-West Highway running during weekday peak hours only. 

Route R1 would also remain straight on Riggs Road, skipping route R2's diversion to Prince Georges Plaza, but would terminate in Presidential Park in  Adelphi, Maryland by making a loop along Metzerott Road, New Hampshire Avenue, Adelphi Road, and Edwards Way, going back onto Riggs Road, where R1 would reach its Adelphi terminus at the intersection of Riggs Road & Edwards Way. This provided new Metrobus service was added on Metzerott Road and the small portion of Adelphi Road between New Hampshire Avenue and Edwards Way that had not previously been available, though the Shuttle-UM Adelphi North bus route did previously operate on these route corridors before Metrobus service existed on them.

In 1998, route R7 was eliminated due to security concerns at the United States Army Research Laboratory. Service was replaced by route R2.

On May 15, 2003, the original bus bays inside Prince Georges Plaza mall, were demolished in order to build a new Target store. Route R2 along with routes 86, C4, F4, F6, F8, R3, R4 and TheBus 13, 14, 18 have stopped entering and looping inside around the mall. This change did not affect routes R1 or R5.

In 2010, a series of proposals were made that'll affect routes R2 and R5 as part of WMATA's FY2011 and FY2012 budget.

WMATA proposed to reroute route R2 into Lewisdale neighborhood along 23rd avenue and University Boulevard replacing route R3 service which is proposed to be eliminated. Route R2 would also discontinue service to Prince George's Plaza station with alternative service provided by routes C4, F4, and TheBus 18. Route R5 would be discontinued and replaced by more frequent R2 service. Route R1 would not be affected by the changes.

The proposal would be brought up again in 2011 sharing the same proposal idea from the 2010 proposed changes.

On June 17, 2012, route R5 was discontinued and route R2 discontinued service to Prince Georges Plaza and instead was rerouted along 23rd avenue and University Boulevard to serve the Lewisdale Neighborhood replacing route R3 which was shorten to Prince Georges Plaza. The only change from the R2 and R3 into Lewisdale was route R3 turned onto Fordham street, while route R2 remained straight along 23rd avenue and turned onto University Boulevard. Service to Prince Georges Plaza was replaced by routes C4 and F4 and TheBus 18.

Discontinued service on Riggs Road between East-West Highway and University Boulevard was taken over by routes C4 and R1. The R2's former routing between the intersection of East-West Highway & Riggs Road and Prince George's Plaza station, was replaced by routes C4, F4 and TheBus 18. The rest of the R2's routing between Fort Totten station and the intersection of Riggs Road & East-West Highway, as well as between the intersection of Riggs Road & University Boulevard and Calverton, remained the same. Route R1 was not affected from any of the changes.

On December 30, 2018, WMATA announced a proposal to make changes to the R2 routing.

One proposal was to extend the R2 beyond Calverton to Muirkirk station on the MARC Camden Line or to Greenbelt station discontinuing the Calverton loop.

The second proposal was to eliminate the segment of Route R2 service 23rd Avenue in Lewisdale and discontinue the R1 completely to create a more direct route for the R2 and to simplify the line. The discontinued segments in Lewisdale would be replaced by a rerouted route F8 and the already running TheBus route 18. Route F8 was proposed to make all stops on the proposed discontinued route R2 service in Lewisdale and discontinue service along Adelphi road. If the proposals are made, the R2 would provide a more direct route to Calverton or Fort Totten for customer convenience with the R1 being discontinued due to it being a duplication of the R2.

Other proposals mentioned that weren't considered were the following:
 Creating a new MetroExtra route for the Riggs Road Line. 
 Moving either route R1 or R2 terminal to Prince George's Plaza station with the other route remaining at Fort Totten station.
 Rerouting route R1 to Takoma Langley Crossroads Transit Center discontinuing service to Adelphi. 
 Giving route R1 daily service but having route R2 be rerouted to Prince George's Plaza station from Calverton.
 Swap route R1 and R2 routing in Lewisdale with R2 remaining on Riggs Road while R1 is rerouted along 23rd Avenue and University Boulevard.

None of the proposals went through due to public feedback.

During the COVID-19 pandemic, all route R1 service was suspended and route R2 was reduced to operate on its Saturday schedule beginning on March 16, 2020. However on March 18, 2020, route R2 was further reduced to operate on its Sunday schedule with weekend service suspended beginning on March 21, 2020. Route R1 was brought back to service on August 23, 2020 while route R2 resumed its regular schedule on the same day.

References

R1